The DB 2/4 Mark III (normally simply called DB Mark III, even at the time of its introduction) is a grand tourer  sold by Aston Martin from 1957 until 1959. It was an evolution of the DB2/4 Mark II model it replaced, using an evolution of that car's W.O. Bentley-designed 2.9 L (2922 cc/178 in³) Lagonda straight-6 engine, redesigned by Tadek Marek.

It was succeeded by the Aston Martin DB4 in 1958.

Overview
Changes included the front grille, that would become the shape of all future Aston Martin models (designed by John Turner (17 at the time)), a new instrument panel, and available Girling disc brakes. The hydraulically operated clutch was new as well, and an optional Laycock-de Normanville overdrive that was attached to the standard four-speed gearbox after the first 100 cars or even an automatic transmission were available. Worm-and-sector steering and a live axle rear end were carryovers. At the rear, the DB2/4 Mark II's tailfins (after the earliest few cars) were altered to use the rear lights from the Humber Hawk.

The standard DBA engine model with twin SU carburettors produced , though an optional dual-exhaust system raised this to a reputed . Thus equipped, the car could reach 60 mph (97 km/h) in 9.3 seconds and hit 120 mph (193 km/h). 

A mid-level DBD option with triple SU 1.75" carbs and  dual exhaust produced , and was fitted to 47 cars. 

One car was fitted with the special DBC competition engine with a reputed 214 b.h.p., this was fitted with racing camshafts, special connecting rods, very high compression pistons (possibly 9.5:1) & three twin-choke Weber 45 DCO 3 carburettors.

Girling disc brakes were fitted as standard to the front wheels of all Mark III Astons after the first 100 had been made. Many cars were upgraded later. Only five automatic cars were made from a total of 551.

A hatchback body style, complete with fold-down rear seats, was introduced in the 2/4 MkI in 1953.

A 1959 review by The US automobile magazineRoad & Track praised the car for everything but its $7,450 price. "A car for connoisseurs," they called it. "The Aston has many virtues and few faults." Among the faults was too-heavy steering effort, high door sills, and a stiff ride.

Coupé, convertible

Along with the hatchback, two two-seater coupé variants of the Mark III were also produced. A "drophead coupé" convertible, while not common, still considerably outnumbers the "fixed head coupé" – 84 of the former were produced, while just five of the latter were built. All five Fixed Head Coupés were built close to the end of Mark III production and feature the mid-spec DBD engine. Both of these body styles feature conventional hinged boot lids rather than the innovative hatchback.

James Bond

James Bond drives an Aston Martin DB Mark III in the novel version of Goldfinger, though it is referred to as a "DB III" in the book – the chapter in which he drives to his famous golf-course encounter with the villain is entitled 'Thoughts in a DB III'. It is the only Bond car in the Ian Fleming novels to have gadgets installed. For the film adaptation five years later, the car was updated to the Aston Martin DB5 model and the array of gadgetry was much expanded. That model was to become one of the most iconic of classic cars as a result.

Production

 DB Mark III: 551
 Hatchback: 462
 Drophead Coupé: 84
 DBA: 68
 DBB: 2
 DBD: 14
 Fixed Head Coupé: 5
LHD: 83

Die-cast models

The DB Mk III was included in the Spot-on range in the early 1960s.

Oxford Die-Cast have issued models of both the hatchback and the drophead.

Spark Models have issued 1/43 models of the drophead, labelled "DB2/4 Cabriolet 1959".

References

Further reading
 
 

DB2 Mark III
Cars introduced in 1957

de:Aston Martin DB2/4#Mark III
Grand tourers